Christopher Rasheed Jones (born July 3, 1991) is an American professional basketball player. After two years at Northwest Florida State and two years at Louisville Jones entered the 2015 NBA draft but was not selected in the draft's two rounds.

High school career
Jones played high school basketball at Melrose High School in Memphis, Tennessee where he was the Co-Star a long the side of Adonis Thomas Chris was a top 50 prospect as a senior at Melrose (Tenn.) High School, Jones originally signed with Tennessee in the same class as former Cardinal Kevin Ware before opting for the junior college route. He was rated as the nation's 10th-best point guard in high school by ESPN, Rivals and Scout, and the No. 39 prospect overall by Rivals. He also averaged 20.5 points, 6.8 rebounds and 6.1 assists per game as a junior in helping lead Melrose to a 26-7 overall record and the Tennessee Class AAA state title and a No. 15 finish in the ESPN Rise Fab 50 national rankings. He earned first-team all-state honors and was the state tournament MVP after scoring 35 points in the championship game. He scored 1,402 in three high school seasons. Transferred for his senior year to Oak Ridge (N.C.) Military Academy, where he averaged 22.5 points, 5.1 rebounds, 5.0 assists and 2.8 steals. Also considered Memphis, Kansas, Baylor, Florida State and Oklahoma State before his commitment to the Cardinals.

College career
A 6'0" point guard, Jones was a junior college star at Northwest Florida State, where he was voted as the Division III NJCAA Player of the Year.  After considering offers from major conference schools, he signed with Louisville and coach Rick Pitino.

He had been suspended from the Syracuse game on February 18 after having sent a threatening text message to a woman he had previously dated, after that woman went into his apartment when Jones was not present and "messed up" his room but was reinstated several days later. After playing against Miami on February 21, he missed that night's curfew, leading to his dismissal. He was dismissed from Louisville on February 22, 2015. Several days after that, Jones was charged with rape stemming from an incident that allegedly occurred the night of the Miami game. In late April, a grand jury chose not to indict Jones and his two co-defendants in the case. Chris Jones and the two co-defendants were exonerated of the all charges after the grand jury heard 2 days of testimony from the two co-defendants and witnesses. Also worthy of note the lead investigator for the University of Louisville Police Lt. John Tarter, was lead detective on 3 other rape cases in which 3 other defendants were convicted and then later exonerated. In one of those cases, the city paid a $3.9 million settlement to William Gregory, who was cleared by DNA evidence.

Professional career
Jones began his pro career in the 2015–16 season in Turkey, with the Yeşilgiresun Belediye. He left the club after some days and joined BG Goettingen. On October 20, 2015, he moved to Paris-Levallois

On August 23, 2016, Jones signed in Greece with Apollon Patras of the Greek Basket League. Jones was released from the Greek team on October 11, 2016 due to Club payment issues. On March 16, 2017, he signed with French club Antibes Sharks as an injury replacement player. On April 10, 2017, he parted ways with Antibes after appearing in two games.

Jones signed with Úrvalsdeild karla club Valur prior to the 2019–20 season. In his debut, Jones scored a season high 31 points in a victory against Fjölnir. On October 31, he refused to play the second half of Valur’s game against Keflavík, effectively ending his stay with the club. Valur officially terminated its contract with Jones the following day. In five games for Valur, Jones averaged 19.0 points and 3.8 assists.

In April 2022, while playing for the London Lightning of the National Basketball League of Canada, Jones was suspended by the league and released by the team after throwing a water bottle on the court and spitting at an official. The following season, after being given a second chance by the Lightning, Jones was again suspended and released following a post-game altercation with the opposing coach.

References

External links
Eurobasket.com profile
RealGM.com profile
Louisville Cardinals bio

1991 births
Living people
American expatriate basketball people in Belgium
American expatriate basketball people in France
American expatriate basketball people in Germany
American expatriate basketball people in Greece
American expatriate basketball people in Turkey
American men's basketball players
Apollon Patras B.C. players
Basketball players from Memphis, Tennessee
Belfius Mons-Hainaut players
BG Göttingen players
Louisville Cardinals men's basketball players
Metropolitans 92 players
Northwest Florida State Raiders men's basketball players
Olympique Antibes basketball players
Point guards
Úrvalsdeild karla (basketball) players
Valur men's basketball players